Ilia Izyaslavich Averbukh (correctly spelled "Ilya"; born 18 December 1973) is a Russian ice dancer. With his then-wife Irina Lobacheva, he is the 2002 Olympic silver medalist, the 2002 World champion and the 2003 European champion.

With Marina Anissina, he is the 1990 and 1992 World Junior champion.

Career 
Averbukh started skating at the age of 5. He initially competed with Marina Anissina. They won two World Junior Championships (1990 and 1992). Averbukh teamed up with Irina Lobacheva in 1992. After the Goodwill Games in the summer of 1994 their coaches moved with many of their students to the United States to train at the University of Delaware. Lobacheva and Averbukh joined them the next year.

In September 2001, Lobacheva injured her knee in training, causing them to miss the Grand Prix season. They won the silver medal at the 2002 Olympics behind Marina Anissina / Gwendal Peizerat.

Lobacheva / Averbukh won gold at the 2002 World Championships and at the 2003 European Championships. They retired from competition at the end of the 2002–2003 season.

Post-competitive career

Following his retirement from competitive skating, Averbukh became a producer of skating shows and tours. Among his projects are Ice Symphony/Ice Age; City Lights; Bolero (a television show pairing skaters with prima ballerinas); and Small Stories of a Big City, an ice show during the 2012 Olympics in London. In January 2013, Averbukh was named an ambassador for the 2014 Winter Olympics in Sochi.

Averbukh works as a choreographer. His past and current clients include:

 Yulia Lipnitskaya
 Ksenia Makarova 
 Evgenia Medvedeva
 Niina Petrõkina
 Elena Radionova
 Sofia Samodurova
 Elizaveta Tuktamysheva
 Dmitri Aliev
 Mikhail Kolyada
 Maxim Kovtun
 Evgeni Semenenko
 Sergei Voronov
 Elena Ilinykh/Ruslan Zhiganshin
 Alexandra Stepanova/Ivan Bukin
 Nelli Zhiganshina/Alexander Gazsi

Programs 
(with Lobacheva)

Results

With Lobacheva

With Anissina

Hall of Fame 
Averbukh is Jewish and elected to the International Jewish Sports Hall of Fame's induction class of 2015.

Other sports 
Averbukh will play a role in the opening ceremony of the 2016 Bandy World Championship.

Personal life 
Lobacheva and Averbukh married in 1995. Their son, Martin, was born in 2004. They divorced in 2007.

Since December 20, 2020, he has been married to the Russian actress Elizaveta Arzamasova. 

On August 14, 2021, the couple had a son.

Politics
In 2023, he stated that Russian athletes should boycott the Olympics if the pre-requisite for their participation is the condemnation of Russia's "special military operation" in Ukraine.

See also 
List of select Jewish figure skaters

References

External links 

 
 Official website of Lobacheva and Averbukh
 Jews in Sports bio
 Irina Lobacheva and Ilia Averbukh divorce 

1973 births
Russian male ice dancers
Jewish Russian sportspeople
Olympic figure skaters of Russia
Figure skaters at the 2002 Winter Olympics
Figure skaters at the 1998 Winter Olympics
Living people
Olympic silver medalists for Russia
Figure skaters from Moscow
Olympic medalists in figure skating
World Figure Skating Championships medalists
European Figure Skating Championships medalists
World Junior Figure Skating Championships medalists
Medalists at the 2002 Winter Olympics
Universiade medalists in figure skating
Goodwill Games medalists in figure skating
Season-end world number one figure skaters
Universiade gold medalists for Russia
Competitors at the 1995 Winter Universiade
Competitors at the 1994 Goodwill Games